Tadodaho was a Native American Hoyenah (sachem) of the Onondaga nation before the Deganawidah and Hiawatha formed the Iroquois League. According to oral tradition, he had extraordinary characteristics and was widely feared, but he was persuaded to support the confederacy of the Five Nations.

His name has since been used as the term, Tadodaho, to refer to the chief chosen to preside over the Grand Council of the Iroquois League. By tradition, as the Onondaga are the "keepers of the council fire", the chief is chosen from that nation. The position is the most influential Iroquois chief in New York State, where the Six Nations confederacy historically had the most influence. This meaning of the term has been used for centuries.

Legend of Tadodaho
Tadodaho was said to be a warrior and primary chief of the Onondaga people. Depending on the speaker's dialect and the writer's orthography, other versions of the name include Adodarhoh, Atartaho, Atotarho, Tatotarho, Thatotarho, and Watatohtahro. In the 1883 work The Iroquois Book of Rites, edited by Horatio Hale, the term Atartaho is said to signify "entangled". In 1889, J. N. B. Hewitt recounted an Iroquois tale which refers to Tadodaho as a "misshapen monster". Jean Houston and Margaret Rubin write in Manual for the Peacemaker that Tadodaho had "matted and spiky hair", and that this visage lent itself to legends that he had snakes in his hair. He is said to have had a "twisted body" and could kill his enemies from a distance without seeing them. Tadodaho ruled with fear, and his people believed him to be a sorcerer. He scared his own people and threatened other peoples, including the Seneca and Cayuga nations. Tadodaho successfully led his Onondaga in raids against the nearby Cayuga people and traveled west, and attacked the Seneca people.

Peace among the nations of the Haudenosaunee was delayed due to fear of Tadodaho. Deganawidah, of the Huron people, and Hiawatha, of the Onondaga, desired peace among the Haudenosaunee peoples. According to legend, all the chiefs were persuaded except for Tadodaho, who was seen as a hindrance to the Great Law of Peace; he quashed three attempts by Hiawatha to initiate peace discussions among the nations. Hiawatha's daughter died after Tadodaho broke Hiawatha's first attempt to bring together a council, and Hiawatha's second daughter died after Tadodaho foiled the second council. Hiawatha's daughters' deaths  were ascribed to Tadodaho's powers. Hiawatha's third daughter died at the council fire of the third meeting, while Tadodaho was present.

Hewitt writes in his 1888 recounting that Hiawatha cried: "All my children are now gone from me; they have been destroyed by Tha-do-da-ho, and he has spoiled our plans. It now behooves me to go among other people. I will start now."

According to Haudenosaunee legend, Hiawatha and Deganawidah used political and spiritual tactics to garner Tadodaho's support. Hiawatha and Deganawidah walked with the chiefs of the Cayuga, Mohawk, Oneida, and Onondaga peoples to Canandaigua Lake while singing a song called the "Peace Hymn". When they arrived at Canandaigua Lake, they convinced the Seneca people to join their cause of peace. Houston and Rubin recount a statement by Deganawidah, who asserted that he was ready to go meet with Tadodaho at Onondaga Lake and win him over to his mission of peace, saying: 
"We must seek the fire and look for the smoke of Tadodaho. He alone stands in our path. His mind is twisted, and there are seven crooks in his body. These must be straightened if the league is to endure."

Hiawatha and Deganawidah consulted with Jigonhsasee, also called Mother of Nations, who advised them how to win Tadodaho to their cause. They used a holy medicine ceremony to soothe Tadodaho and heal his mind and body. In one recounting of the story, Jigonhsasee herself spoke privately with Tadodaho. Hiawatha combed the matted portions out of Tadodaho's hair, and Deganawidah massaged Tadodaho's body with herbs and wampum, and smoothed out the seven crooks in Tadodaho's body. After Tadodaho was healed, he permitted the Onondaga people to join the council of peace. Tadodaho joined the League of the Great Peace and was given the title of "firekeeper" of the confederacy; he was chairman of the council of nations. The final steps toward peace were conducted at Onondaga Lake.

The Tadodaho legend continues to be told in Haudenosaunee society. It has come to refer to the chief who chairs the council of the Onondaga, called Tadodaho. Charles L. Henning writes in the work "Hiawatha and the Onondaga Indians", published in 1902 in the periodical The Open Court: 
"...the name Tadodaho remained in the tribe, and when a man was obliged to hold the office of head-chief of the Onondagas, he was always called Tadodaho. The Tadodaho is the only proper man to invite the people to the general council of the five nations, and for this reason he is considered the 'fire keeper,' because the Onondagas were the keepers of the great council fire."

Term for spiritual leader
The term Tadodaho later was used by the Iroquois to refer to their most influential  spiritual leader in New York State; it has been used in this way for centuries. The Tadodaho in New York State is the spiritual leader of the Haudenosaunee, Six Nations that includes the Cayuga, Mohawk, Oneida, Onondaga, Seneca, and Tuscarora people. The post is also called the "Head Chief of All the Six Nations". He presides over the Grand Council of the Haudenosaunee (also called Iroquois). The Great Council Fire of the Iroquois League is still located within the Onondaga reservation in present-day New York. Many of the Iroquois live in Canada, where their ancestors moved after the American Revolutionary War, as they were allies of the defeated British. The Crown gave them some land in compensation for what they lost.

Along with other Native American leaders, the Tadodaho is responsible for maintaining the history of the Haudenosaunee people. The position of Tadodaho is a lifetime appointment. According to tradition, when the previous Tadodaho dies, a council of chiefs from the Haudenosaunee chooses a leader from the Onondaga people.

Contemporary leaders and issues
As Tadodaho in 1968, George A. Thomas demanded the return to the Iroquois of 25 wampum belts that were held by the New York State Museum. Thomas said: 
"it was wrong for our grandfathers to give away the wampum. The wampum tells of old, old agreements and passes on the thoughts of our grandfathers. We would like to see them. Our people would like to touch them."An anthropologist described the conflict as "the great wampum war", and the issue affected the relationship between the Iroquois people, the New York State Museum, and academia. Thomas had emphasized spiritual leadership and said the wampum belts represented important traditions for the people. This was in the period of Native American activism that led to passage of NAGPRA, federal legislation to protect Native American cultural resources and encourage museums to return remains and grave goods to the nations.

On December 7, 1968, Leon Shenandoah was selected as the next Tadodaho. He worked in daily life as a custodian at Syracuse University. Shenandoah asserted both the political responsibilities and spiritual nature of his role. He opposed any of the Haudenosaunee's entering into gambling enterprises, warning of the moral problems associated with such decisions. He was highly respected for his spiritual leadership and, when he died in 1996, his death was mourned by Native Americans across the United States. He had served as Tadodaho for over 25 years during a period of major changes among the Iroquois and other Native American nations, who have been reasserting sovereignty.

In 2002, Sidney Hill was selected as the Tadodaho. He has been active in land claim cases in New York, by which the Iroquois nations have sought return or compensation for lands they were forced to cede to New York in the aftermath of the American Revolutionary War. The federal courts have upheld some land claim cases.

The  ownership assertion by the Onondaga included land along Lake Ontario from the Thousand Islands through Syracuse, to the border of Pennsylvania, and including Onondaga Lake. Hill wanted to highlight the desire of his people to see Onondaga Lake restored to environmental health.

In May 2013, Tadodaho Hill sent a letter to several Iroquois communities in an effort to guide their relation to the Confederacy and its traditional principles. He (and others) have opposed the Oneida Nation of New York's May 16, 2013 agreement with New York State that would involve the tribe's putting their land in trust, accepting New York taxes, and additional New York jurisdiction over their affairs, as part of a deal to gain gambling. (According to Doug George-Kanentiio, a Mohawk journalist, this tribe is not officially part of the Haudenosaunee, as it did not exist when the Confederacy was formed.)

In popular culture
Rick, the protagonist of Simon Spurrier's novel, The Culled (2006, book 1 of The Afterblight Chronicles), belongs to the Haudenosaunee people and is guided through crises by the sachem. Another character, named Hiawatha, saves Rick's life and advises him the Tadodaho have said Rick and Hiawatha's courses are "aligned".

See also

Economy of the Iroquois
Iroquoian languages
Iroquois mythology
Onondaga language
Tribal chief

References

Bibliography

Further reading

External links
Tadodaho Sid Hill, Syracuse Peace Council website
Tadodaho Sid Hill, "Our debt to nature", letter to the editor of The Post-Standard, hosted at website of Onondaga Peace Festival

Onondaga people
Onondaga
Native American leaders
Titles and offices of Native American leaders